Anita is an extinct town in Hensley Township, Johnson County, Indiana, United States.

Anita was the site of an Illinois Central Railroad passenger depot, the station house of which was moved and converted to a home near Trafalgar in 1936.

By the 1980s, the Anita had been depopulated. The state highway department intended to remove it from maps, but preservationists succeeded in placing a roadside plaque to commemorate the town.

Geography

See also
List of ghost towns in Indiana

References

Former populated places in Johnson County, Indiana
Former populated places in Indiana